The 1893 LSU football team represented Louisiana State University (LSU) during the 1893 college football season. This was the first year that LSU sponsored a football team. The Tigers were coached by university professor Dr Charles E. Coates against in-state school Tulane of New Orleans. The game sparked a rivalry between the Tigers and the Green Wave that has lasted generations.  Future Louisiana governor Ruffin G. Pleasant was the quarterback and captain of the LSU team.  In the first game against Tulane, LSU football players wore purple and gold ribbons on their uniforms.  According to legend, purple and gold were chosen because they were Mardi Gras colors, and the green of Mardi Gras was sold out.  An LSU baseball team had also worn purple and gold in its first varsity game against Tulane earlier in 1893, even though LSU's official colors at the time were actually blue and white.

The rules of play in 1893 were more like rugby than what might be considered modern football.  The rules called for eleven players on a side with a scrimmage line dividing the teams.  The team on offense was required to begin a play by kicking the ball either forward or backward to the quarterback. The quarterback couldn't run with the ball, but he could hand it off.  In order to keep possession, the offensive team had to either gain five yards in three downs or not lose ten yards.  Forward passing was not allowed.  Touchdowns counted for 4 points, with 2 points for a goal after a touchdown, 4 points for a field goal, and 2 points for a safety. Players wore an assortment of "football armor" such as "shin guards, rubber noses, head bands, ankle protectors, elbow and hip pads, ear guards, and mouth pieces.  The game consisted of two 45-minute halves.

Schedule

Roster

Roster from Fanbase.com and LSU: The Louisiana Tigers

See also
List of the first college football game in each US state

References

LSU
LSU Tigers football seasons
College football winless seasons
LSU Tigers football